The Venezuelan Summer League Reds, or VSL Reds, was a Minor League Baseball affiliated team of the Cincinnati Reds and based in the city of Valencia, Carabobo in Venezuela.

See also
Venezuelan Summer League Reds players

External links
VSL Reds
VSL Reds Stats

Cincinnati Reds minor league affiliates
Defunct minor league baseball teams